The Council for the Curriculum, Examinations & Assessment (CCEA) is a Non-departmental public body (NDPB) of the Department of Education (Northern Ireland). Its function and purpose is described in Part VIII of the Education (NI) Order 1998.

CCEA's duties and functions are to:

 keep under review all aspects of the curriculum, examinations and assessment for grant aided schools and colleges of further education and to undertake statutory consultation on proposals relating to legislation;
 advise the DE on matters concerned with the curriculum, assessment, examinations and external qualifications and accredit and approve qualifications;
 conduct and moderate examinations and assessments, ensuring that standards are recognised as equivalent to standards of examinations and assessments conducted by other bodies or authorities exercising similar functions in the United Kingdom;
 publish and disseminate information relating to the curriculum, assessment and examinations;
 develop and produce teaching support materials for use in schools; and
 carry out research and development.
CCEA also has a remit for the development of educational technology and the production of multimedia resources and is considered a leader in this field.

CCEA was established on 1 April 1994 as a NDPB and is based in Belfast. It replaced the Northern Ireland Schools Examination and Assessment Council and the Northern Ireland Schools Examination Council.

Awarding qualifications

CCEA offers a wide range of qualifications, such as GCSEs, including the new GCSE Double Award specifications in vocational subjects, GCE A and AS levels, Entry Level Qualifications, Keyskills, Essential Skills, and Graded Objectives in Modern Languages. Due to educational reforms of the Conservative Party under Prime Minister David Cameron CCEA (among other UK examination boards i.e. Edexcel, AQA, OCR and WJEC) continuously redevelops syllabi for GCSEs and GCE A Levels.

Principal products and services

CCEA’s principal products and services are to meet the requirements outlined in the Education (NI) Order. CCEA’s duties and functions are therefore to:

 Keep under constant review all aspects of the curriculum, examinations and assessment for grant aided schools and colleges of further education and to undertake statutory consultation on proposals relating to legislation;
 Advise the Department of Education (NI) or the Minister for Education  on matters concerning curriculum, assessments, examinations and external qualifications and to accredit and approve qualifications;
 Conduct and moderate examinations and assessments, keeping standards in line with the rest of the UK;
 Publish and disseminate information relating to the curriculum, assessment and examinations;
 Develop and produce teaching support materials for use in schools and other educational Centres;
 Carry out research and development into curriculums, examinations, assessments, new media and software/hardware environments.

Miscellaneous

CCEA attracted media interest in 2014, due to allegations related to working conditions for some staff and the threat of strike action by CCEA’s recognised trade union NIPSA.

Incorporated examination boards
 Northern Ireland School Examinations and Assessment Council (NISEAC)
 Northern Ireland School Examinations Council (NISEC)

Chief Executive 
The Chief Executive of CCEA is responsible for the operational delivery of examinations and assessments to thousands of pupils across Northern Ireland, the monitoring of standards in qualifications, and the forming of relevant policy advice to the Department of Education.

Chief Executive - Gerry Campbell (March 2023 - present)

References

External links
CCEA website link one
CCEA website link two

Examination boards in the United Kingdom
Education administration in Northern Ireland
1994 establishments in Northern Ireland